Tai Wei is a crater on the Moon. Its name was adopted by the International Astronomical Union in 2015, after one of the three enclosures in an ancient Chinese star map.

References

Impact craters on the Moon